Lojzička is a 1936 Czechoslovak comedy film, directed by Miroslav Cikán. It stars Karel Hašler, Markéta Krausová, and Helena Bušová.

Cast
Jarmila Beránková as Aloisie Strnadová alias Lojzička
Jára Kohout as Jikra, listonos
Božena Svobodová as Mlynárka
Zita Kabátová as Karla
Vlasta Hrubá as Pavla
Jiří Dohnal as Jean Poulard
Antonín Novotný 	as Karel Drozd
Míla Svoboda as Ing. Cermák
Svetla Svozilová as Rita
Helena Bušová as Barca
Jaroslav Marvan as Sedlák

References

External links
Lojzička at the Internet Movie Database

1936 films
Czechoslovak comedy films
1936 comedy films
Films directed by Miroslav Cikán
Czechoslovak black-and-white films
Czech comedy films
1930s Czech films